Kim Ngọc (1917-1979), born Kim Văn Nguộc, was a Vietnamese politician who served as the Communist party secretary of Vinh Phuc province from 1959 to 1977. He implemented household contracting throughout the province. Although it was successful, Ngoc was criticized by Le Duan for breaking the law. The policy implementation was stopped, and Ngoc had to criticize himself for his "wrong political route".

Ngoc was not rehabilitated until 1995. He was decorated Order of Independence (1995) and Order of Ho Chi Minh (2009) posthumously.

Bí thư Tỉnh ủy, a Vietnamese television drama, was based on this story.

See also
Đổi Mới

References

External links
Nguyễn Tham Thiện Kế; Nhà cải cách Kim Ngọc - cha đẻ khoán 10, kỳ 1, kỳ 2, kỳ 3, kỳ 4 (cuối); Báo Tiền Phong, 4 kỳ. 

1917 births
1979 deaths
Communist Party of Vietnam politicians
People from Vĩnh Phúc province
Recipients of the Order of Ho Chi Minh
Members of the National Assembly (Vietnam)